Anthony George Zimbulis (11 February 1918 – 17 May 1963) was an Australian cricketer. He was a right-handed batsman and leg break, googly bowler. He played 15 first-class cricket matches for Western Australia between 1934 and 1940, scoring 320 runs and taking 43 wickets.

References

External links
 

1918 births
Australian cricketers
Western Australia cricketers
Sportsmen from Western Australia
1963 deaths